TMB may refer to:

Organizations
Tamilnad Mercantile Bank Limited, India
Texas Medical Board
 Thai Military Bank
 Transports Metropolitans de Barcelona, Spain

Places
Kendall-Tamiami Executive Airport near Miami, Florida, US, IATA code
Tsing Ma Bridge, a longest span suspension bridge in Hong Kong

Events
 Tour du Mont Blanc, a walk

Science and technology
 Trimethylborane
 Tumor mutational burden
 3,3',5,5'-Tetramethylbenzidine, a chemical stain.
 TMB and TMSB series mines

Arts
 The Spirit of Troy, the University of Southern California Trojan Marching Band
 The Midnight Beast, a British comedy music group